Bråvalla Festival was a Swedish four-day music festival that was held annually. It was Sweden's biggest and most popular music festival. It was held at Bråvalla Wing outside of Norrköping. The inaugural season of the festival was from 27 to 29 June 2013. It headlined Rammstein, Green Day and Avicii in additions to tens of artists and acts. The second season was held between the 26 June and 28 June 2014 and was headlined by Iron Maiden, Kanye West and Kings of Leon. The third season of the festival was held between 25–27 June in 2015. It was headlined by Robbie Williams, Muse and Calvin Harris. The fourth season was held between 30 June – 2 July in 2016. The fifth and last season was held between 28 June – 1 July in 2017.

The hosts, FKP Scorpio, estimated about 40,000 people would attend the festival in 2013 but eventually 51,590 tickets were sold. This record was again broken in 2014 when 51,683 tickets were sold.

On 27 June 2014, several people were injured during the festival when lightning struck and one person was taken to hospital with life-threatening injuries.

On July 1, 2017 FKP Scorpio announced that Bråvalla will not take place in 2018.

Festival by year 2013-present

Stages
Panorama - The main stage of the festival.
Luna - A stage very similar to Panorama when it comes to size.
Juno - A smaller stage next to Panorama.
Sensation - This stage is the home of electronic dance music.
Pacific - A smaller music stage located inside a tent.
Norrköping Lounge - This stage is an indoor stand-up comedy stage.

References

Music festivals in Sweden
Summer events in Sweden